Melanie is a 1982 Canadian drama film starring Glynnis O'Connor, Lisa Dalbello, Burton Cummings and Don Johnson.

Plot summary
Melanie, a rural Arkansas woman, travels to Los Angeles in an effort to regain custody of her son from her ex-husband, Carl. Her illiteracy poses a major obstacle. She meets Rick, a faded musician, with whom she develops a relationship. Rick's attorney teaches her to read and write, and helps her with her custody fight.

Cast
 Glynnis O'Connor as Melanie
 Paul Sorvino as Walter
 Burton Cummings as Rick
 Trudy Young as Ronda
 Don Johnson as Carl
 Donann Cavin as Ginny
 Jamie Dick as Tyler
 Jodie Drake as Eula
 Lisa Dalbello as Marcie
 Yvonne Murray as Brandy
 Martha Gibson as Waitress
 Rocco Bellusci as Dana
 David Wills as Daryll Adrian
 L. Q. Jones as Buford (uncredited)

Production
Filming began in Toronto on 2 June 1980. Additional filming was conducted in Los Angeles.

Reception
Roger Ebert noted that Melanie was "an uneven and sometimes frustrating but very alive movie".

Awards

Melanie earned seven nominations for the 4th Genie Awards:

 Best Performance by a Foreign Actress: Glynnis O'Connor (won) 
 Best Original Song: Burton Cummings "You Saved My Soul" (won)
 Best Adapted Screenplay: Richard Paluck and Robert Guza Jr. (won) (rescinded)
 After the ceremony, the academy learned that the short story on which the screenplay was based had not been previously published, making it not an adaptation according to the rules of the award.
 Best Direction: Rex Bromfield (nominated)
 Best Supporting Actress: Trudy Young (nominated)
Best Costume Design: Julie Ganton (nominated)
 Sound Editing: Wayne Griffin and Dennis Drummond (nominated)

References

External links
 
 

1982 films
English-language Canadian films
Canadian drama films
Embassy Pictures films
Films scored by Paul Zaza
Films directed by Rex Bromfield
1980s English-language films
1980s Canadian films